The 1977 North American Soccer League playoffs began on August 10 and ended on August 28 with Soccer Bowl '77 at Civic Stadium in Portland, Oregon. 12 out of 18 teams qualified after a 26-match regular season, six from each conference.

Playoff format
The top three teams in each division would quality for the playoffs, similar to the 1976 playoffs. The first round and the Soccer Bowl were single games, but the division championships and conference championships were two-game series. If teams were tied at one win apiece at the conclusion of Game 2, there would be a 30-minute sudden death mini-game and a shootout if necessary.

Playoff seeds

Atlantic Conference

Eastern Division
Fort Lauderdale Strikers – Eastern Division champions, 161 points
Cosmos – 140 points
Tampa Bay Rowdies – 131 points

Northern Division
Toronto Metros-Croatia – Northern Division champions, 111 points
St. Louis Stars – 104 points
Rochester Lancers – 99 points

Pacific Conference

Southern Division
Dallas Tornado – Southern Division champions, 161 points
Los Angeles Aztecs – 147 points
San Jose Earthquakes – 119 points

Western Division
Minnesota Kicks – Western Division champions, 137 points
Vancouver Whitecaps – 124 points
Seattle Sounders – 119 points

Bracket

First round

Atlantic Conference

(E2) Cosmos vs. (E3) Tampa Bay Rowdies

(N2) St. Louis Stars vs. (N3) Rochester Lancers

Pacific Conference

(S2) Los Angeles Aztecs vs. (S3) San Jose Earthquakes

(W2) Vancouver Whitecaps vs. (W3) Seattle Sounders

Division Finals

Atlantic Conference

(E1) Fort Lauderdale Strikers vs. (E2) Cosmos

Cosmos win series 2–0

(N1) Toronto Metros-Croatia vs. (N3) Rochester Lancers

Rochester wins series 2–0

Pacific Conference

(S1) Dallas Tornado vs. (S2) Los Angeles Aztecs

Los Angeles wins series 2–0

(W1) Minnesota Kicks vs. (W3) Seattle Sounders

Seattle wins series 2–0

Conference Finals

Atlantic Conference

(E2) Cosmos vs. (N3) Rochester Lancers

Cosmos win series 2–0

Pacific Conference

(S2) Los Angeles Aztecs vs. (W3) Seattle Sounders

Seattle wins series 2–0

Soccer Bowl '77

References

External links
 The Year in American Soccer – 1977
 Chris Page's NASL Archive
 Complete NASL Results and Standings

North American Soccer League (1968–1984) seasons
1977 in American soccer